Moslemabad (also Romanized as Moslemābād; also known as Gāv Khāneh) is a village in Shur Dasht Rural District, Shara District, Hamadan County, Hamadan Province, Iran. At the 2006 census, its population was 601, in 140 families.

References 

Populated places in Hamadan County